was a junior college in Nagareyama, Chiba, Japan, and is part of the Edogawa Gakuen network.

The institute was founded in 1985, and closed in 2007.

External links
 Official website

Educational institutions established in 1985
Japanese junior colleges
1985 establishments in Japan